Peter Rieger can refer to:

 Peter Rieger (boxer) (born 1944), German boxer
 Peter Rieger (long jumper) (born 1953), German athlete